Cape Tribulation is a section of the Western rim of Endeavour crater on the planet Mars. The MER-B Opportunity rover spent 30 months exploring Cape Tribulation from 2014 to 2017. The top of Cape Tribulation is about  higher than the plains that surround the crater.

The MER-B Opportunity rover summited Cape Tribulation in January 2015, which was the highest Martian elevation achieved yet on its mission. Then in March 2016 it accomplished the distance of a classic marathon. Also in March 2016 it achieved the steepest slope traverse (32 degree) yet of its mission, surpassing the slope it took on at Burns Cliff in 2004. MER-B was trying to reach a target on Knudsen Ridge, on the south side of Marathon Valley, which meant attempting a steep grade which can cause wheel slippage.  Another effect of this angle was that sand and dust that had collected on the rover flowed in streaks over the back of the rover, such was the incline.

Examples of locations:
Cape Tribulation Summit
Marathon Valley
Knudsen ridge
Wharton Ridge
Spirit of Saint Lois Crater
Spirit Mount

Naming

Wdowiak Ridge

Summit

Marathon valley
In 2015 MER-B entered Marathon Valley in Cape Tribulation and would study it until September 2016.

Marathon Valley was targeted for exploration by MER-B because CRISM instrument in orbit on the Mars Reconnaissance Orbiter detected clay minerals at this location.

Spirit of St. Louis Crater
Within its center is a rock spire and the regolith in the crater has a darkened hue. The crater is on the outer edge of the Western rom of Endeavour crater. The MER-B rover reached it in April 2015 and took panoramic color photos of the site.

Additional NASA team named features:
Marathon Monument
Donald A Hall
Lindbergh Mound
Roosevelt Field
Lambert Field
Harry H Knight
Harold M Bixby

Context map

Mineral map

See also
Cape York (Mars)
Cape Tribulation (Earth)

External links
Sol 4766 – Exploring the Entrance to Perseverance Valley
 Opportunity Mars Rover Presses On Toward Rich Science Targets Despite Episodic Amnesia
Cape tribulation as seen from the south east

References

Margaritifer Sinus quadrangle
Mars Exploration Rover mission